The Pontypool and Blaenavon Railway is a  volunteer-run heritage railway in South Wales, running trains between a halt platform opposite the Whistle Inn public house (famed for its collection of miners' lamps) southwards to the town of Blaenavon via a two-platform station at the site of former colliery furnace of the Big Pit National Coal Museum.

The line is the highest preserved standard-gauge line in the United Kingdom, and also uniquely having the only standard-gauge rail-over-rail bridge within preservation.

History of the line 

The line from Brynmawr to Blaenavon was originally built under an Act of 1866 by the Brynmawr and Blaenavon Railway and immediately leased to the London and North Western Railway (LNWR) to transport coal to the Midlands via the Heads of the Valleys line. The line was completed in 1869 and the LNWR commenced operating passenger trains over the line the following year (1870). Eight years later it was extended to meet the Great Western Railway (GWR) at Abersychan & Talywain. Here the line carried on down the valley through Pontypool Crane Street Station to the coast at Newport. In 1922, the LNWR was grouped into the London, Midland and Scottish Railway. In later years the line saw a variety of GWR locomotives operating from pit to port, however the railway retained its LNWR infrastructure up until the very last days before its closure.

Coal traffic
From the turn of the century the line served mining activity centred on several pits and collieries between Brynmawr and Waunafon. The first of these was the Waun Nantyglo colliery, which was situated a little east of a tramway which later carried the B4248 Brynmawr to Blaenavon Road. The connection was removed by 1925. As Waunafon was approached on a facing branch to the left was built, leading to Clydach colliery, but these had gone by 1915, to be replaced by New Clydach Colliery sidings. Vestiges of these remained until 1950. The space between the single-platform station at Waunafon and the branch was occupied by a series of loops and sidings. In 1913 a small platform, called Garn-yr-Erw halt was built just north of the Whistle Road Bridge. This halt had no timetable for passengers as it was used only by miners.

Closures
By 1938 Milfraen Pit had ceased production having exhausted its own coal reserves, the branchline that served it was removed in 1937. The line was closed to passengers, not during the Beeching Cuts which befell the GWR route to Blaenavon Low Level, but in 1941 due to the exigencies of the Second World War. Blaenavon shed closed in 1942 and eventually goods also ceased in 1954. The line was retained for wagon storage until 1953, and around 1950, a temporary siding was laid in connection with opencast workings on the Blorenge, branching east roughly at the point where the Milfraen Colliery branch had previously branched west. The declining situation continued through the 1950s, then Varteg Hill subsequently closed in 1964, leaving Big Pit as the primary exporter of coal left. The once double track to Pontypool was then singled in June 1965. Although passenger and goods traffic had long ceased to Brynmawr the track was re-laid by the NCB to just south of Waunafon station again during the 1970s for the Black Lion Disposal Point washery.

Although the track along the whole route to Brynmawr was finally lifted in July 1961, the section from Blaenavon to Pontypool was still in use for coal trains from other local mines until Big Pit finally closed in 1980. The line from Cwmbran was dismantled right up to outside Blaenavon High Level station whilst the washery and other colliery buildings were demolished during 1987. Much of the railway today has now become part of the National Cycle Network Route 46.

Visitor attraction 
It runs every weekend between spring and September. There is also a selection of special weekends through the spring and summer, daily (with the exceptions of Monday and Fridays) in August, as well as Santa Specials nearing Christmas.

The railway did not increase its length of track for a quarter century after its opening, but increased as a going concern, with a larger number of volunteers, a larger amount of operational rolling stock, and more definite plans for the railway's future.

Expansion of the P&BR 

In May 2010 the railway was extended a distance of roughly  southwards to the site of the former Blaenavon High Level station (once the London and North Western Railway's station in the town).

The Pontypool Blaenavon Railway Company was granted an Order under the Transport and Works Act to extend and operate the line.

Work, which started in late 2004, was initially complicated by difficulty in determining who built the railway. The order allowing most of the initial construction was the Brynmawr and Blaenavon Act of 1866, but a short section in the south was built under the LNWR (Wales &c) Act of 1875. Once the two months spent on this research was complete matters progressed rapidly so that a formal application to the Welsh Assembly was made on 3 May 2005. By the end of June 2005 the application became public with a two-month subsequent period allowed for formal objection.

By 28 November 2005, the inspector appointed by the National Assembly for Wales, Stuart B Wild, MRTPI, MCMI made his report to Parliament. Subsequently, a full meeting of the planning Decision Committee of the National Assembly for Wales, chaired by Carwyn Jones, Minister for Environment, Planning and Countryside, approved the application on 24 January 2006.

The minister in turn wrote to Winckworth Sherwood on 31 January. The Order, called the Pontypool and Blaenavon (Phase 1) Order 2006 was finally made on 20 June 2006 and came into force on 21 June 2006.

The route southwards was made difficult by the need to refurbish a number of bridges en route. A substantial report issued by the Company to Torfaen County Borough Council, the successor to the Welsh Development Agency, and other interested parties, estimated the lowest cost for the extension and the provision of a minimal station at High Level at between £235K and £395K, with cost of the bridges lying between £162K and £323K—by far the dominant item in the total cost.

The Company eventually achieved funding from the Welsh Assembly Government's Heads of the Valleys programme to meet much of the refurbishment costs. Blaenavon (High Level) station is close to the centre of Blaenavon town centre, and as a result, a substantial increase in passenger numbers is confidently expected. Blaenavon is the centre of the World Heritage Site of the Blaenavon Industrial Landscape, which includes Big Pit National Coal Museum and Blaenavon Ironworks.

The presence of the railway there is expected to significantly add to the visitor experience and tourist potential of the town.

There is also growing political interest for the preserved line to extend further again to Brynmawr which takes the railway over the local authority boundary from Torfaen into Blaenau Gwent and also the historic county boundary from Monmouthshire into Brecknockshire. However the emphasis with the local authority is that this phase will serve as a community link, rather than a tourist attraction.

On 10 September 2021, a new locomotive shed was opened.

Future expansion 

With extensions southwards to Varteg and beyond, it has been found that the deck of Varteg Road bridge was beyond economical repair, and could not simply be refurbished as was the case with the other bridges on the line. The local authority replaced the deck with two new bridges, one for the railway, and the other for the cycleway in April 2011.

Presently it is currently impossible to advance more than about  before coming into conflict with the cycleway. Torfaen County Borough Council has recognised the railway's potential to expand towards Talywain and have included this within their local development plan. This will also allow for route sharing to accommodate both Cycle Route and future line proposals whilst ensuring measures are taken to minimise any conflict occurring in dual operation.

Southward expansions to Wainfelin may be jeopardised by recent land reclamation schemes presented by Spring UR Ltd. These plans require the swift destruction of the prominent Big Arch, a brick-lined tunnel structure built in 1879 and already a Grade II listed structure. The plans opt for its demolition in order to breach the disused railway embankment, this would create a wider access route for heavy road traffic for open-casting west of Talywain village to commence.

Not only would this prevent future line extensions but impede the Celtic Trail cycle path altogether as well. Whether a more beneficial plan for the surrounding area, or alternative put forward by the Torfaen Council, is currently unknown as these proposals are still in the early stages of public meetings.

After Pontypool (Wainfelin), any further restoration of the original route down the valley is now virtually impossible as the line through Pontypool to Newport via Clarence Street was lost in the 1980s to the construction of the A4043 bypass. Retail development such as Tesco now occupies the site of Pontypool Crane Street station, however, the preservation society managed to rescue this up-platform station building by painstakingly deconstructing brick-by-brick and stored onsite for eventual re-construction. As of January 2014, the stonework has been used to decorate the new station building at Furnace Sidings.

Appearance in popular culture

The railway has been used in various episodes for the BBC series The Indian Doctor.

Motive power 
Main reference

Steam locomotives
Andrew Barclay  "Rosyth No. 1" built in 1914. Operational, overhaul completed in 2014.
W.G. Bagnall  No. 3061 'Empress' built in 1954. Previous overhaul completed in 2014. Purchased from Mangapps Railway Museum in September 2018. Withdrawn for overhaul in 2022.
Hunslet  No. 1873 'Jessie' built in 1937. Operational. Moved from the Llangollen Railway and converted from Thomas the Tank Engine in early 2019. 
Hunslet Austerity  No. WD71515 "Mech Navvies" built in 1945. Withdrawn September 2018, overhaul started July 2019.
GWR 5700 Class  No. 9629 built 1945. Undergoing overhaul.
Andrew Barclay  No. 2074 "Llantarnam Abbey" built in 1939. Undergoing overhaul.
Andrew Barclay  No. 1260 "Forester" built in 1911. Donated by Newport City Council, it had previously been on static display in Newport. Undergoing overhaul off site at Williton on the West Somerset Railway
Hudswell Clarke Works No 1857  Operational, this locomotive was built in 1952 by Hudswell Clarke by the National Coal Board and was employed at NCB Gawber Colliery at Barnsley. 857 was first preserved by the Coventry Steam Railway Centre which was started in 1986 by a group of enthusiasts who wanted to restore it. The locomotive spent some years on the Swindon and Cricklade Railway but is now undergoing a heavy overhaul at a site near Henstridge in Somerset. By the end of April 2022, the overhaul had been completed and the locomotive was undertaking test runs on the West Somerset Railway. The locomotive is now operational on the Pontypool and Blaenavon Railway.
1680 Avonside Engine Company  'Sir John' built 1914 - Owned by Vale of Neath Railway. Stored awaiting overhaul.
 Andrew Barclays Works No 1219 Caledonian Works  Operational, this locomotive was built by Andrew Barclay in 1910 and was delivered new to Stewart & Lloyd Ltd at their Clydedale Works in Mossend near Motherwell. In preservation the locomotive spent some time at the Pontypool & Blaenavon Railway but was restored on the West Somerset Railway by an apprentice at Williton. It was returned to steam in early 2016 before spending some time on loan to the Pontypool & Blaenavon Railway. The locomotive returned to Williton, but now redecides on the Pontypool and Blaenavon railway.

Diesel locomotives
BR Co-Co Class 37 No. 37 216 (D6916) Nearing end of restoration back into early BR green.
BR Co-Co Class 37 No. 37 023 (D6723) Undergoing Restoration
BR Co-Co Class 31 No. 31 203 (D5627) 'Steve Organ G.M' operational in early BR green
Hudswell Clarke  No. 1344. Operational.
John Fowler & Co.  No. RT1. Undergoing Restoration
Hunslet  No. 170 "Ebbw". Undergoing restoration.
Hunslet  No. 5511. Operational.
Wickham 6947. Undergoing Restoration

Diesel multiple units
BR Class 117 DMS No. 51351. Stored unserviceable
BR Class 117 DMS No. 51397. Undergoing restoration. In lined green livery

Burglary
After the railway's 2018 four-day Halloween event which attracted more than 4,000 visitors, a burglary occurred resulting in £14,000 being stolen in one night along with hundreds of pounds worth of damage to glass. The safe in the station building at Blaenavon was literally ripped from the floor and taken just hours after volunteers had finished locking up on Wednesday night. The crime scene was discovered the next morning and reported by a volunteer. The railway has already set up a fundraiser and over £6,000 has been raised so far. No suspect has been found yet.

See also
 List of closed railway stations in Britain
 List of closed railway lines in Great Britain

References

External links 
Official website
Torfaen local plan

Heritage railways in Torfaen
History of Monmouthshire
Standard gauge railways in Wales